Bingo is an album by the Rova Saxophone Quartet featuring compositions by Lindsay Cooper, Barry Guy, Fred Frith, and Larry Ochs which was recorded in 1996 and released on the Canadian Victo label.

Reception

Allmusic gave the album a 4½-star rating while its review by Thom Jurek stated, "Rova's dedication, mastery, and almost magical interplay make this one of the quartet's most sophisticated and enjoyable records, but also its most accessible. This is a brilliant recording by a truly gifted group".

The Penguin Guide to Jazz nominated the album as part of its "Core Collection" of recommended jazz recordings.

Track listing
 "Face in the Crowd" (Lindsay Cooper) – 11:52
 "Initials" (Larry Ochs) – 13:52
 "Witch Gong Game" (Barry Guy) – 4:43
 "Water Under the Bridge" (Fred Frith) – 5:43
 "Can of Worms" (Cooper) – 5:45
 "Witch Gong Game" (Guy) – 25:43

Personnel
Bruce Ackley – soprano saxophone, tenor saxophone
Steve Adams – alto saxophone, sopranino saxophone
Larry Ochs – tenor saxophone, sopranino saxophone
Jon Raskin – baritone saxophone, alto saxophone, sopranino saxophone

References

1998 albums
Rova Saxophone Quartet albums